Chariklia Baxevanos (born 15 March 1936) is a Swiss actress. She appeared in more than sixty films since 1952.

Selected filmography

References

External links 

1936 births
Living people
Swiss film actresses
Swiss television actresses
20th-century Swiss actresses
Film people from Zürich